Alabbas Gara oghlu Isgandarov (20 November 1958, Kurdlar, Agdam District, Azerbaijan SSR, USSR - 4 March 1992, Gazanchy, Agdam District, Azerbaijan) was the National Hero of Azerbaijan and warrior during the Nagorno-Karabakh conflict.

Early life and education 
Isgandarov was born on 20 November 1958 in Kurdlar village of Agdam District of Azerbaijan SSR. He completed his secondary education at Kurdlar village secondary school. Isgandarov served in the Soviet Armed Forces. In 1991, he voluntarily joined self-defense battalion in Agdam.

Personal life 
Isgandarov was married and had three children.

First Nagorno-Karabakh War 
When First Nagorno-Karabakh War started, Iskandarov voluntarily joined one of the self-defense battalions formed in Agdam. He participated in battles around the village of Umudlu. Iskandarov and his soldiers surrounded by Armenian forces in Umudlu and were unable to escape. The Armenian militants fired on them from all sides.  After a long period of besiege, Isgandarov was able to secretly return to his military unit with his soldiers.

On March 4, 1992, he was killed in a heavy battle around the village of Gazanchy.

Honors 
Alabbas Gara oghlu Isgandarov was posthumously awarded the title of the "National Hero of Azerbaijan" by Presidential Decree No. 135 dated 13 August 1992.  

He was buried at a Martyrs' Lane cemetery in Agdam.

See also 
 First Nagorno-Karabakh War
 List of National Heroes of Azerbaijan

References

Sources 
Vugar Asgarov. Azərbaycanın Milli Qəhrəmanları (Yenidən işlənmiş II nəşr). Bakı: "Dərələyəz-M", 2010, səh. 140–141.

1958 births
1992 deaths
Azerbaijani military personnel
Azerbaijani military personnel of the Nagorno-Karabakh War
Azerbaijani military personnel killed in action
National Heroes of Azerbaijan
People from Agdam District